The 2004–05 Vysshaya Liga season was the 13th season of the Vysshaya Liga, the second level of ice hockey in Russia. 28 teams participated in the league. MVD Tver and Vityaz Chekhov were promoted to the Russian Superleague.

First round

Western Conference

Eastern Conference

Playoffs

3rd place
 (W2) Torpedo Nizhny Novgorod – (E2) Amur Khabarovsk 1:3, 4:3, 1:0 OT

External links 
 Season on hockeyarchives.info
 Season on hockeyarchives.ruv

2004–05 in Russian ice hockey leagues
Rus
Russian Major League seasons